There Comes a Time is an album by the jazz composer, arranger, conductor and pianist Gil Evans, recorded in 1975 and performed by Evans with an orchestra featuring David Sanborn, Howard Johnson, Billy Harper and Ryo Kawasaki. The album was re-released with an altered tracklist on CD in 1988.

Reception

In a review for AllMusic, Scott Yanow wrote: "overall the music... is quite rewarding, it's a creative big band fusion that expertly mixes together acoustic and electric instruments. This was one of Gil Evans' last truly great sets."

Critic Richard Williams, writing for The Guardian, called the album an "immortal recording," one "often based on no more than a scrap of material coaxed into shimmering, multifaceted life."

Track listing
All compositions by Gil Evans except as indicated
 "King Porter Stomp" (Jelly Roll Morton) – 3:48 
 "There Comes a Time" (Tony Williams) – 16:10 Re-edited 14:23 version included on CD reissue 
 "Makes Her Move" – 1:42
 "Little Wing – 5:33 Omitted from CD reissue  
 "The Meaning of the Blues" (Bobby Troup, Lee Worth) – 5:51 Unedited 20:01 version included on CD reissue
 "Aftermath the Fourth Movement Children of the Fire" (Hannibal Marvin Peterson) – 5:45 Omitted from CD reissue   
 "Joy Spring" (Clifford Brown) – 2:19 Bonus track on CD reissue  
 "So Long" – 16:37 Bonus track on CD reissue 
 "Buzzard Variation" – 2:35 Bonus track on CD reissue   
 "Anita's Dance" – 2:55
Recorded in RCA's Studio B in New York City on March 6 (tracks 2 & 7–9), April 11 (tracks 1, 3, 5 & 10) and April 14 (tracks 4 & 6) with additional recording on April 25, June 10 and 12, 1975

Personnel
Gil Evans – piano, electric piano, arranger, conductor
Hannibal Marvin Peterson – trumpet, koto, vocals  
Ernie Royal, Lew Soloff – trumpet, flugelhorn, piccolo trumpet  
John Clark, Peter Gordon  – French horn  
Tom Malone – trombone, bass trombone, tuba, synthesizer
Joe Daley, Bob Stewart – tuba  
Howard Johnson – tuba, bass clarinet, baritone saxophone, trombone 
David Sanborn – alto saxophone, soprano saxophone, flute 
George Adams, Billy Harper – tenor saxophone, flute  
David Horowitz – electric piano, synthesizer, electronic organ  
Pete Levin – synthesizer  
Joe Gallivan – synthesizer, guitar, steel guitar, percussion, congas  
Ryo Kawasaki – guitar, pedals  
Herb Bashler, Paul Metzke – electric bass  
Bruce Ditmas, Tony Williams – drums 
Sue Evans – congas, timpani, percussion, celeste, cowbell  
Warren Smith – mallet percussion, bongos

References 

1975 albums
Gil Evans albums
Albums arranged by Gil Evans
RCA Records albums